The Malagasy are an Austronesian-speaking African ethnic group indigenous to the island country of Madagascar. Traditionally, the population have been divided by subgroups (tribes or ethnicities). Examples include "Highlander" (ethnically Austronesian/Malay race-Indonesian with less Bantu ancestry) groups such as the Merina and Betsileo of the central highlands around Antananarivo, Alaotra (Ambatondrazaka) and Fianarantsoa, and the "coastal dwellers" (ethnically Bantu with less Austronesian ancestry) with tribes like the Sakalava, Bara, Vezo, Betsimisaraka, Mahafaly, etc. The Merina are also further divided into two subgroups. The “Merina A” are the Hova and Andriana, and have an average of 30–40% Bantu ancestry. The second subgroup is the “Merina B”, the Andevo, who have an average of 40–50% Bantu ancestry. They make up less than 1/3 of Merina society. The Malagasy population was 2,242,000 in the first census in 1900. Their population experienced a massive growth in the next hundred years, especially under French Madagascar.

Genetics and origins of the populations 

The genetics element about the dual origin of the Malagasy can be traced to the mid-20th century with results regarding blood group distribution. An expansive island-wide survey of the genetic diversity has been performed from 2008 to 2018. This project was called "MAGE" (for Madagascar, Anthropology Genetics Ethno-linguistic). Around 3000 inhabitants of Madagascar have participated in this study and provided their saliva for a genetic study. Three hundred villages across Madagascar have been sampled in terms of genetic, linguistic and cultural diversity. This research was led and performed by Malagasy and European researchers and academics. This study demonstrated that all Malagasy people have mixed African and Asian ancestry. 

But the proportion of ancestral genes differs. Coastal Malagasy populations, including the Temoro, Vezo, and Mikea, etc. have approximately 70% African ancestry and 30% Asian ancestry, while highlander tribes tend to have lower African ancestry at around 45%. In a recent island-wide survey the male-only Y chromosomes of African origin are more common than those of East Asian origin, but it varies depending on the study (70.7 vs. 20.7 or 51% vs 34%). However the mtDNA lineages, passed down from mother to child, are the opposite (42.4% African origin vs. 50.1% East Asian origin).

Due to the proximity to Africa, the connection with Asian populations exhibited the most curiosity. Around 1996, a study was launched in an attempt to identify the presence of the Polynesian motif in the Malagasy population (mtDNA haplotype B4a1a1a). A more recent study to identify two additional mutations (1473 and 3423A) found in all Polynesian motif carriers of Madagascar, hence named the Malagasy motif. The frequency varied among three ethnic groups: 50% in Merina, 22% in Vezo, and 13% in Mikea. Based on this result, a study suggested that Madagascar was settled approximately 2,200 years ago by a very small group, which consisted of approximately 30 women, where 28 (93%) of them have maritime Southeast Asian descent and 2 (7%) of them have African descent. The Malagasy population existed through the intermixing of the first small founding population. The closest Asian parental population of the Malagasy are the Banjar and other South Kalimantan Dayak people of south east Borneo. Language footprints of their ancestors from Southeastern Asia can presently be witnessed by many shared basic vocabulary with Ma'anyan, a language from the region of the Barito River in southern Borneo.

Historical subdivisions
The difference in origins remains somewhat evident between the highland and coastal regions . In addition to the distinction in term of ancestral proportion between highland and coastal Malagasy, one may speak of a political distinction as well. Merina monarchs in the late 18th and early 19th century, united the Merina principalities and brought the neighbouring Betsileo people under their administration first. They later extended Merina control over the majority of the coastal areas. The neighbouring island of Moheli was also ruled by a Muslim Merina dynasty founded by Abderremane, Sultan of Mohéli, who was a brother-in-law of King Radama I. The military resistance and eventual defeat of most of the coastal communities assured their subordinate position vis-à-vis the Merina-Betsileo alliance. During the 19th and 20th centuries, the French colonial administration capitalized on and further exacerbated these political inequities by appropriating existing Merina governmental infrastructure to run their colony. This legacy of political inequity dogged the people of Madagascar after gaining independence in 1960; candidates' ethnic and regional identities have often served to help or hinder their success in democratic elections.

Within these two broad ethnic and political groupings, the Malagasy were historically subdivided into specifically named ethnic groups, who were primarily distinguished from one another on the basis of cultural practices. These were namely agricultural, hunting, or fishing practices; construction style of dwellings; music; hair and clothing styles; and local customs or taboos, the latter was known in the Malagasy language as fady. The number of such ethnic groups in Madagascar has been debated. The practices that distinguished many of these groups are less prevalent in the 21st century than they were in the past. But, many Malagasy are proud to proclaim their association with one or several of these groups as part of their own cultural identity.

 "Highlander" ethnic groups 
Merina
Sihanaka
Betsileo
Zafimaniry
Coastal ethnic groups 
Antaifasy or Antefasy
Antaimoro or Temoro or Antemoro
Antaisaka or Antesaka
Antambahoaka
Antandroy or Tandroy
Antankarana
Antanosy or Tanosy
Bara
Betsimisaraka
Bezanozano
Mahafaly
Makoa
Mikea
Sakalava
Tanala
Tsimihety
Vezo

Malagasy diaspora

Countries with a significant Malagasy diaspora include France (specifically the overseas departments of Mayotte and Réunion), Comoros (specifically the island of Moheli), South Africa, Latin America and the Caribbean and the United States.

The Malagasy diaspora in the United States includes those descended from people who, slave or free, came during the 18th and 19th centuries. Other Americans of Malagasy ancestry are recent immigrants from Madagascar. Some notable Americans who have Malagasy ancestry include Andy Razaf, Katherine Dunham, Regina M. Anderson, William H. Hastie, George Schuyler and Philippa Schuyler, Muhammad Ali, Robert Reed Church and Mary Church Terrell, Frederick D. Gregory, Thomas P. Mahammitt, Paschal Beverly Randolph, Maya Rudolph, Claude McKay, Jess Tom, Ben Jealous, and Keenan Ivory Wayans. 

Malagasy were also brought to Latin America, notably Peru, during the Transatlantic Slave Trade. A community of descendants of these Malagasy reside in Morropón (Piura), a city in northern Peru; the Afro-Peruvians of Malagasy descent number about 7,000. Luis Miguel Sánchez Cerro, the Peruvian army officer who served as the 48th President of Peru from 1931 to 1933, as well as Interim President of Peru, was a notable descendant of this community. They call themselves Mangaches or Malgaches. This section of Piura is called la Mangachería.

The first recorded African slave in Canada, Olivier Le Jeune, was taken from Madagascar to New France in 1628.

See also
 Malagasy language
 Culture of Madagascar
 Culture of Indonesia
 Seychellois Creole people
 Mauritian Creoles
 Cafres
 Cape Malay

References

Further reading
 Memories of Madagascar and Slavery in the Black Atlantic by Wendy Wilson-Fall, 2015, Ohio University Press—Malagasy diaspora
 Sandra Evers, Gwyn Campbell, Michael Lambek (2013). Contest for Land in Madagascar: Environment, Ancestors and Development. African Social Studies Series. Brill. , .

 
Ethnic groups in Madagascar
Austronesian peoples
Bantu peoples
Indonesian diaspora
Asian diaspora in Africa
Oceanian diaspora in Africa